National Nuclear Safety Administration or NNSA is a central government agency responsible for regulating nuclear safety, supervision on all civilian nuclear infrastructure in China. It also inspects nuclear safety activities and regulate the approval mechanism.

History
The National Nuclear Safety Administration (1984–1989) was established in October 1984. It was a
subordinate agency of the State Science and Technology Commission which had independent regulatory of nuclear safety in mainland China.

In 1990, the State Science and Technology Commission became the National Science and Technology Commission but  National Nuclear Safety Administration was still under its administration until 1998.

In 1998 the National Nuclear Safety Administration was transferred to the State Environmental 
Protection Administration.

In 2008, the State Environmental Protection Administration was upgraded to a full ministry of the Chinese state called the Ministry of Environmental Protection and the National Nuclear Safety Administration was retained under its administrative purview.

In 2017, new laws strengthened the powers of the NNSA, creating new "institutional mechanisms", a clearer "division of labour" and more disclosure of information.

See also

References

External links 
 

Governmental nuclear organizations
Science and technology in the People's Republic of China
Government agencies of China
Nuclear power in China
Nuclear technology in China